The Numa Ridge Fire Lookout in Glacier National Park is significant as one of a chain of staffed fire lookout posts within the park. The low two-story timber-construction structure with a pyramidal roof was built in 1933. The lookout was built to a standard plan originated by the U.S. Forest Service as part of a program to provide overlapping fire lookout coverage within the park.

Author Edward Abbey spent the summer of 1975 manning Numa Ridge Lookout.

References

Government buildings completed in 1934
Fire lookout towers on the National Register of Historic Places in Montana
Rustic architecture in Montana
National Register of Historic Places in Flathead County, Montana
1934 establishments in Montana
National Register of Historic Places in Glacier National Park